Beshneh (also Romanized as Bashneh; also known as Bishneh) is a village in Qatruyeh Rural District, Qatruyeh District, Neyriz County, Fars Province, Iran. At the 2006 census, its population was 221, in 57 families.

References 

Populated places in Neyriz County